

This is an incomplete list of U.S. college mascots' names, consisting of named incarnations of live, costumed, or inflatable mascots. For team names, see List of college sports team nicknames.

Mascot index

0–9
 #1 Fan – child-like costumed mascot of Saginaw Valley State University

A
 Ace Purple – mascot of the University of Evansville Purple Aces
 Ace the Skyhawk – mascot of the Stonehill College Skyhawks 
 Ace the Warhawk – mascot of the University of Louisiana at Monroe Warhawks
 Action C – mascot of the Central Michigan University Chippewas
 Air Dunker – inflatable mascot of the Murray State University Racers, cousin of Dunker
 Albert and Alberta Gator – the male and female alligator mascots of the University of Florida Gators 
 Alphie – the wolf mascot of the University of Nevada, Reno Wolf Pack 
 Archibald "Archie" Eagle – mascot of the University of Southern Indiana Screaming Eagles
 Archibald "Archie" McGrowl – cougar mascot of the Misericordia University Cougars
 Adelaide, "Addie" – English Bulldog mascot of the University of Redlands Bulldogs
 Aristocat – mascot of the Tennessee State University Tigers and Lady Tigers
Army Mules (General Scott, Raider and Ranger) – three mules that act as the mascots for the United States Military Academy Black Knights
 Argie the Argonaut – mascot of the University of West Florida Argonauts
 Arnie – mascot of the University of Massachusetts Dartmouth Corsairs
 Artie the Fighting Artichoke – mascot of the Scottsdale Community College Fighting Artichokes
 Arty the Aardvark – mascot of the Aims Community College Aardvarks
 Arvee the Golden Eagle – mascot of the Rock Valley College Golden Eagles
 Athena – the female mascot of Claremont McKenna College, Harvey Mudd College, and Scripps College
 Attila – the duck mascot of the Stevens Institute of Technology Ducks
Aubie – the tiger mascot of the Auburn University Tigers
 Avalanche the Golden Bear – mascot of the Kutztown University of Pennsylvania Golden Bears
 Awesome Eagle – mascot of the Tennessee Technological University Golden Eagles
 Azul the Eagle – mascot of the Florida Gulf Coast University Eagles

B
 Baby Blue – secondary mascot of the Delaware Fightin' Blue Hens
 Baby Jay – co-mascot of the Kansas Jayhawks
Baldwin the Eagle – mascot of the Boston College Eagles
  Baldwin Jr – inflatable version of Baldwin the Eagle at Boston College
 Bananas T. Bear – mascot of the Maine Black Bears
 The Battling Bishop – mascot of the Ohio Wesleyan Battling Bishops
 Baxter – mascot of the Binghamton Bearcats and the Klamath Community College Badgers
 The Bearcat – mascot of the Cincinnati Bearcats
 Beaker – Eagle mascot of the Morehead State Eagles
 Beaver – mascot of the Caltech Beavers, the Maine at Farmington Beavers and the Polytechnic University of Puerto Rico Beavers
 Bella and Roscoe – co-mascots of the Angelo State Rams and Rambelles 
 Ben – Bulldog mascot of the McPherson Bulldogs
 Benny the Bengal – Bengal tiger mascot of the Idaho State Bengals
Benny Beaver – mascot of the Oregon State Beavers
 Bernie – St. Bernard dog mascot of the Siena Saints
Bevo – a live Texas longhorn steer, mascot of the Texas Longhorns
Big Al – Elephant mascot of the Alabama Crimson Tide
 Big Blue – Lion mascot of the Old Dominion Monarchs and Bull mascot of the Utah State Aggies
Big Jay – co-mascot of the Kansas Jayhawks
Big Red and LU - Cardinals, co-mascots of the Lamar Cardinals and Lady Cardinals
Big Red and Sue E. Pig – Wild pigs, co-mascots of the Arkansas Razorbacks
 Big Red – mascot of the Western Kentucky Hilltoppers and Lady Toppers and the Sacred Heart Pioneers
 Big Stuff – Eagle mascot of the Winthrop Eagles
Bill the Goat – live/costumed mascot of the United States Naval Academy
 Billy Bluejay – mascot of the Creighton Bluejays
 Billy Bronco – mascot of the Cal Poly Pomona Broncos
 Billy the Panther – mascot of the Eastern Illinois Panthers
 Bison – mascot of the Howard Bison and the Gallaudet Bison
The Bird – mascot of the Air Force Falcons
 Black Jack – mascot of the Army Black Knights
 Blaster the Burro – co-mascot of the Colorado Mines Orediggers
  Blaze – mascot of the Alverno Inferno, the California Vulcans, the UAB Blazers, the Cortland Red Dragons, and the UT Arlington Mavericks
  Blitz – Bearcat mascot of the Willamette Bearcats
  Blizzard – Husky mascot of the St. Cloud State Huskies
Blizzard T. Husky – mascot of the Michigan Tech Huskies
 Blockie – an anthropomorphized block, unofficial mascot of the University of Houston–Clear Lake
 Blossom and Weezy – co-mascots of the Arkansas–Monticello Boll Weevils and Cotton Blossoms
 Blue – live bobcat mascot of the Kentucky Wildcats (does not attend games)
 Blue Jay – mascot of the Creighton Bluejays and the Johns Hopkins Blue Jays
 The Blue Devil – mascot of the Duke Blue Devils
 Bobby – Bearcat mascot of the Northwest Missouri State Bearcats
 Bobcat – mascot of the UC Merced Golden Bobcats, the NYU Violets, and the Bates Bobcats
Boilermaker Special – Locomotive replica mascot of the Purdue Boilermakers
 Boko – Bobcat mascot of the Texas State Bobcats
 Bodi and Brandi – male and female Bison mascots of the Manhattan Area Technical College Bison
 Bogey – Bearcat mascot of the McKendree Bearcats
 Boomer – mascot of the Missouri State Bears and Lady Bears, the Lake Forest Foresters, the Quinnipiac Bobcats, and a co-mascot of the Oklahoma Sooners
 Boss – Boston Terrier mascot of the Wofford Terriers
 Boss Hogg – inflatable mascot of the Arkansas Razorbacks
 Brewer – alcoholic beverage mascot of the Vassar Brewers
 Brit – Knight mascot of the Albion Britons
 Brody the Bruin – Bear mascot of the Bob Jones Bruins
 Bruce D. Bear and Sugar Bear – co-mascots of the Central Arkansas Bears and Sugar Bears
 Bruiser – mascot of the Belmont Bruins and the Adrian Bulldogs
 Bruiser and Marigold – Bear mascots of the Baylor Bears
 Bruno – Bear mascot of the Brown Bears
Brutus Buckeye – anthropomorphic buckeye mascot of the Ohio State Buckeyes
Brutus – mascot of the Salt Lake Community College Bruins and the Ferris State Bulldogs
 Bryan – mascot of the Bryan Lions
 Bucky (or Bucky Bison) – mascot of the Bucknell Bison
Bucky Badger – mascot of the Wisconsin Badgers
 Bucky the Beaver – mascot of the American River Beavers, the Bemidji State Beavers, and the Caltech Beavers
 Bucky the Bronco – mascot of the Santa Clara Broncos
 Bucky The Parrot – mascot of the Barry Buccaneers
 Buddy Broncho – mascot of the Central Oklahoma Bronchos
 The Buffalo – mascot of the Milligan Buffaloes
 Buford T. Beaver – mascot of the Buena Vista Beavers
 Bullet – live black American Quarter Horse mascot of the Oklahoma State Cowboys and Cowgirls
 Bully – Bulldog mascot of the Mississippi State Bulldogs
 Burghy – Cardinal mascot of the SUNY Plattsburgh Cardinals
 Burrowing Owl – mascot of the Florida Atlantic Owls 
 Buster Rameses XXIX – live ram mascot of the Fordham Rams
Buster Bronco – mascot of the Boise State Broncos 
Buster Bronco – mascot of the Western Michigan Broncos
Butch T. Cougar – mascot of the Washington State Cougars
Butler Blue – live Bulldog mascot of the Butler Bulldogs 
Buzz – Yellow jacket mascot of the Georgia Tech Yellow Jackets

C
CAM the Ram – live/costumed mascot of the Colorado State Rams 
 Captain Skyhawk – mascot of the UT Martin Skyhawks
 Captain Chris – mascot of the Christopher Newport Captains, based on Christopher Newport 
 Captain Cane – anthropomorphized golden hurricane, mascot of the Tulsa Golden Hurricane
Cardinal – mascot of the Wesleyan University Cardinals, the Incarnate Word Cardinals, and the Lamar Cardinals and Lady Cardinals
 Captain Buc – mascot of the Massachusetts Maritime Buccaneers
 CavMan – mascot of the Virginia Cavaliers. 
Cecil the Sagehen – mascot of the Pomona-Pitzer Sagehens
 Cecil the Crusader – mascot of the North Greenville Crusaders
Champ – Bobcat mascot of the Montana State Bobcats, live bulldog mascot of the Minnesota Duluth Bulldogs, and Husky mascot of the University of Southern Maine Huskies
Chaparral – mascot of the College of DuPage Chaparrals
 Charlie Cardinal – mascot of the Ball State Cardinals
Charlie the Charger – Horse mascot of the New Haven Chargers
 Charlie the Coyote – mascot of the South Dakota Coyotes
 Charlie T. Cougar – mascot of the Concordia University Chicago Cougars
 Charlie Oredigger – mascot of the Montana Tech Orediggers
 Chauncey – Rooster mascot of the Coastal Carolina Chanticleers and Beaver mascot of the Champlain College Beavers
 Chester and Melrose – Lions, co-mascots of the Widener University Pride
Chief Osceola and Renegade - Indigenous chief and horse mascots of the Seminoles
 Chip – Buffalo mascot of the Colorado Buffaloes
 Chompers – Alligator mascot of the Allegheny College Gators
 Clash the Titan – mascot of the University of Wisconsin-Oshkosh Titans
 Clawed Z. Eagle – mascot of the American Eagles
 Clutch – Hawk mascot of the Lehigh Mountain Hawks
 Clyde and Haley – anthropomorphized comets, co-mascots of the Olivet College Comets
 Clyde The Cougar – mascot of the College of Charleston Cougars
 Cocky – mascot of the Jacksonville State Gamecocks
Cocky – mascot of the South Carolina Gamecocks
 Cody – Cougar mascot of the Columbus State Cougars
 The Colonel – mascot of the Eastern Kentucky Colonels and Lady Colonels
Colonel Rock – live Bulldog, co-mascot of the Western Illinois Leathernecks
Colonel Tillou – mascot of the Nicholls State Colonels
 Cool E. Cougar/Coolie – cougar mascot of the College of Alameda Cougars
 Coop and Scarlet – Cardinals, co-mascots of the Saginaw Valley State Cardinals
Cooper the Cougar- mascot of the Caldwell University Cougars
Corky the Cardinal – mascot of the Concordia University Ann Arbor Cardinals
Corky the Hornet – mascot of the Emporia State Hornets
Cosmo the Cougar – mascot of the BYU Cougars
 Cowboy Joe – live Shetland pony mascot of the Wyoming Cowboys and Cowgirls
Crash the Cougar – mascot of the Cal State San Marcos Cougars
Crimson Joe – mascot of the Calumet College of St. Joseph Crimson Wave
 The Crusader – mascot of the Valparaiso Crusaders and the Evangel Crusaders
 Cubby – secondary mascot of the Brown Bears, geared towards younger fans
Cy the Cardinal – mascot of the Iowa State Cyclones
 Curtiss the Warhawk – mascot of the Auburn Montgomery Warhawks
Cutlass T. Crusader/Cuttie – lion mascot of the Clarke University Pride
 Cyrus – human mascot of the Presbyterian Blue Hose

D
 D'Artagnan and the Blue Blob – co-mascots of the Xavier Musketeers
 Damien, The Great Dane – The mascot of University of Albany
 Deacon – the mascot of the Bloomfield College
 Delphy – the mascot of the Universidad del Sagrado Corazón
Demon Deacon – the mascot of Wake Forest University
 Diego – the mascot of University of San Diego
The Oregon Duck – the mascot of the Oregon Ducks for the University of Oregon
Duke Dog – the costumed mascot of the James Madison Dukes
Doc – the costumed mascot of Towson Tigers
 Dominic – the Rambouillet ram mascot of Angelo State University
 Don – the mastodon of Indiana University-Purdue University Fort Wayne since 1970
 Dooley – the skeleton of Emory University
 The Don – the mascot of the University of San Francisco
 The Doyle Owl – unofficial mascot of Reed College, a stone or cement owl sculpture subject to theft, showings, battles royale, capture, and related pranks
 Dubs II – the 14th live husky mascot of the University of Washington
 Duncan – the dolphin mascot of Jacksonville University
 Dunker – the horse mascot of Murray State University
 Durango – the bull mascot of University of Nebraska at Omaha
 Dusty – the Dustdevil mascot of Texas A&M International University
 Dutch – the costumed mascot of the Hope College Flying Dutchmen

E
Eddie the Cougar, #57 – mascot of Southern Illinois University Edwardsville
 Eddie the Eagle – mascot of North Carolina Central University
 Eddie the Golden Eagle – mascot of California State University, Los Angeles
 Eli the Eagle – mascot of Oral Roberts University
 Ellsworth the Golden Eagle – the mascot of SUNY Brockport
 Elwood – horse mascot of Longwood University
 Scrappy the Eagle – mascot of University of North Texas
 Ernie the Eagle – mascot of Bridgewater College
 Ernie the Eagle – mascot of Embry–Riddle Aeronautical University
Eutectic – the mascot of St. Louis College of Pharmacy
 The Explorer – the mascot of La Salle University from the La Salle Explorers

F
 The Falcon – United States Air Force Academy
 Fandango – a costumed falcon mascot of Messiah College
 Fear, The Gold Knight – mascot of the College of Saint Rose
The Fighting Okra – name of the unofficial mascot of Delta State University since the late 1980s. Has been featured in David Letterman's "Top Ten Worst Mascots List"
 Fighting Pickle – mascot of University of North Carolina School of the Arts since 1975
 Finn – Mascot of Landmark College
Flex the Falcon – falcon mascot of Bentley University
 Freddie – the costumed falcon mascot of Fairmont State University
Freddie and Frieda Falcon – costumed mascots of the Bowling Green State University Falcons
 Freddy Falcon – mascot of the University of Wisconsin–River Falls Falcons and of Friends University Falcons
 Freedom – live bald eagle mascot of Georgia Southern University
 The Friar – mascot of Providence College; a costumed Dominican friar, re-introduced in 2001 after a six-season lapse.
 Friar Boy – a Dalmatian, animal mascot of Providence College; the last Friar Boy (V) passed in 2001; also was a costumed Dalmatian from 1995–2001.
 Flash – Kent State University Golden Flashes
 Flying Fleet – mascot of Erskine College

G
 Gael Force 1 – the knight mascot of Saint Mary's College of California.
 Gaucho – the mascot of The University of California, Santa Barbara.
 Gaylord and Gladys – Camels, co-mascots of Campbell University
 General Grizzly – the grizzly bear of Georgia Gwinnett College.
 General The Jaguar – The mascot of Texas A&M University-San Antonio.
 George – The mascot of The George Washington University Colonials.
 Gladys – the squirrel mascot of Mary Baldwin College (from the squirrel on their coat of arms)
Golden Eagle – mascot of the Marquette Golden Eagles
 Golden Griffin – griffin; mascot for Canisius College
 Golden Lion – lion; mascot for Raritan Valley Community College
Goldy the Gopher – University of Minnesota
 Gompei – the bronzed head of a now deceased goat the mascot of Worcester Polytechnic Institute
 Gnarls – The Narwhal is the mascot of The New School since 2013
 Gnarlz – Introduced in 2008 as the more aggressive partner of Wild E. Cat at the University of New Hampshire
 The Governor— mascot of Austin Peay University
 Greyhound – mascot of Loyola University Maryland 
 Griff – live bulldog mascot of Drake University
 Griff – lion; mascot of Emerson College
 Griffin – official or quasi-official mascot of Reed College, taken from the coat of arms of Simeon Reed whose widow's bequest funded the establishment of the college; see also The Doyle Owl q.v. 
 Grizz – mascot of Oakland University
 Grizz the Logger – mascot of University of Puget Sound
 Grubby Grubstake – the miner mascot of South Dakota School of Mines and Technology
Gunrock the Mustang – University of California, Davis
 Gunston – a green creature with a colonial tri-cornered hat named after Gunston Hall, the colonial-period home of the namesake of George Mason University
 Gus the Eagle – Costumed mascot of Georgia Southern University
 Gus the Goose – Costumed mascot of the Washington College Shoreman
 Gus the Gorilla – Pittsburg State University
 Gussie – the live northern goshawk mascot of State University of New York at New Paltz (SUNY New Paltz)

H
Hairy Dawg – a person costumed as a Bulldog, University of Georgia (See also Uga below)
 Halo – a live St Bernard dog, the official mascot of Carroll College, Helena, Montana
Handsome Dan – a live Bulldog, the official mascot of the Yale Bulldogs and the first mascot adopted by a university in the USA
 Harry the Hawk – the 9-foot-tall 'walk-around' mascot of the University of Maryland Eastern Shore
Harry the Husky – the husky mascot of the University of Washington
 Havoc the Wolf – the costumed wolf mascot of Loyola University New Orleans
The Hawk – a costumed student who serves as mascot of the Saint Joseph's Hawks; the mascot flaps its "wings" without interruption (even during halftime) throughout SJU basketball games
 Hendrix the Husky – the costumed mascot of University of Washington Tacoma
Hera – the live owl mascot of Florida Atlantic University
Herbie Husker – the costumed mascot of the University of Nebraska
Herky the Hawk – the costumed hawk-like bird of indeterminate species, mascot of the University of Iowa
 Herky the Hornet – the costumed hornet mascot of Sacramento State
 Herm – the costumed lion mascot of Eastern Mennonite University
 Hey Reb – the former costumed mascot of the University of Nevada, Las Vegas. Retired in 2021
 The Highlander – the costumed mascot of Radford University
 Hink – the costumed mascot of Butler University
 Hunter the Hillcat – the costumed mascot of Rogers State University
Hokie Bird – is the costumed mascot of Virginia Tech
Holly the Husky – is the costumed mascot of University of Washington Bothell
 Hoot – the mascot of the Rowan University Profs
Hootie the Owl – the costumed red owl mascot of Keene State College
Hootie the Owl – the costumed mascot of Oregon Institute of Technology
Hooter T. Owl – mascot of the Temple Owls
Hook 'em – the costumed longhorn mascot of The University of Texas
 Howie the Hawk – the costumed mascot of the University of Hartford
 Howl and Scarlet – Wolves, co-mascots of the Arkansas State Red Wolves

I
 Ichabod – the mascot of Washburn University representing its namesake's first name.
 Iggy the Greyhound – mascot of Loyola University Maryland
 Iggy the Golden Eagle – mascot of Marquette University.
 Iggy the Lion – mascot of Loyola Marymount University.
 Ike the Eagle – mascot of Oklahoma Christian University.
 Indy – the Greyhound mascot of the University of Indianapolis.
 Indians – the mascot of Catawba College

J
 Javelina – the mascot of Texas A&M University–Kingsville
 J.C. – the live ram mascot of Shepherd University
 J. Denny and Jenny Beaver – co-mascots of Bluffton University
 Jack the Jackrabbit – the rabbit mascot of South Dakota State University
Jack the Bulldog – a live Bulldog of the Georgetown Hoyas. There is a costumed mascot with the same name.
 Jack and Jill – Sailfish, co-mascots of Palm Beach Atlantic University
 Jay and Baby Jay – are costumed "Jayhawk" mascots of the University of Kansas that are a mythical cross between a blue jay and a sparrowhawk.
 Jay – the costumed bluejay mascot of Johns Hopkins University
 Jawz, Jinx and Jazzy – Jaguars, co-mascots of Indiana University–Purdue University Indianapolis
 Jerry the Bulldog – the live English Bulldog mascot of Arkansas Tech University. After a 76-year absence, Jerry was adopted as the Arkansas Tech mascot on October 23, 2013.
Joe Bruin and Josephine Bruin – Bears, co-mascots of the University of California, Los Angeles (UCLA)
 Joe Miner – the pickaxe, pistol, and slide rule-toting mascot of Missouri University of Science and Technology (Missouri S&T)
 Joe Vandal – the costumed Vandal mascot of the University of Idaho.
 John Poet – mascot of Whittier College (both named after poet John Greenleaf Whittier)
Johnny Thunderbird – mascot of St. John's University (New York)
Jonas – the cougar mascot of Clark University
Jonathan – the husky mascot of the University of Connecticut
Joust the Knight – the knight mascot of Calvin University
Judge – the live black bear mascot of Baylor University. The name is also given to the inflatable costumed mascot.
Jumbo – the elephant mascot of Tufts University
 Junior Smokey – the second costumed blue tick hound mascot of the University of Tennessee that looks younger than the original costumed Smokey (see below), but considers himself as his brother.

K
 Kaboom – Bradley University's costumed mascot of the Bradley Braves
 Kate and Willy – Hofstra University's costumed lion mascots.
 Kasey the Kangaroo – University of Missouri-Kansas City's costumed mascot.
Keggy the Keg – of Dartmouth College (unofficial, proposed by the Jack-o-Lantern humor magazine).
 Katy the Kangaroo – Austin College's costumed mascot.
 Kid – one of the two costumed tiger mascots of Texas Southern University.
 Killian the Gael – The mascot of Iona College.
Knightro and Glycerin – Knights, co-mascots of the University of Central Florida
 King Husky – the live Husky mascot of Northeastern University.
King Triton – the mascot of University of California, San Diego (UCSD).
 Klawz Da Bear – the costumed bear of the University of Northern Colorado.
 Klondike – the costumed polar bear of Ohio Northern University.
 Kody – the costumed kodiak bear of Cascadia College.

L
 Landshark – The recently adopted mascot of the University of Mississippi (Ole Miss).
 LaCumba – The former live jaguar mascot of Southern University.
 Lafitte – the costumed alligator in pirate garb that is the mascot of the University of New Orleans Privateers.
 Laker Louie – the costumed mascot of the Lake Land College Lakers.
 LeeRoy the Tiger – the costumed mascot of Trinity University (Texas).
 Leroy the Lynx – the costumed mascot of Rhodes College. The new name (formerly known as Maximus) and costume were introduced in 2013 after a vote from the student body.
 Leo and Lea Leopard – two costumed mascots of the University of La Verne
 Leo and Una – two live lion mascots of the University of North Alabama Lions
The Leprechaun – the mascot of the Notre Dame Fighting Irish
 Lightning – the costumed blue pegasus-like creature that is the mascot for the Middle Tennessee Blue Raiders
 Lil' Joe Mountie – the mascot of Mt. San Antonio College Mounties, in Walnut, California.
Lil' Red – the inflatable-costumed boy mascot of the University of Nebraska–Lincoln
 Lizzie the Screaming Eagle – the costumed eagle mascot of the oldest women's college in New Jersey, the College of Saint Elizabeth
 Lobo – the mascot of John Carroll University. Lobo comes from the Script of St. Ignatius of Loyola's (founder of the Jesuits) family "Lobo Y Olla" translated to "Wolf and Pot".
 Lord Jeff – formerly the unofficial mascot of Amherst College, it has now been disassociated from the school by the Board of Trustees. Originally depicted Lord Jeffery Amherst, the namesake of the town where the College is located.
 Louie the Cardinal – the official name of the mascot of the University of Louisville
 LU Bison – the costumed bison mascot of Lipscomb University
 LU Wolf – a wolf is the official mascot of the Loyola-Chicago Ramblers; got a major facelift in 2001
Louie the Laker – mascot of Grand Valley State University
 Louie the Loper – mascot of University of Nebraska at Kearney
 Louie the Triton – the mascot of University of Missouri–St. Louis
 Louie Lobo and Lucy Lobo – Wolves, co-mascots of the University of New Mexico
 Louie the Lumberjack – mascot of Northern Arizona University
 Lucky the Lion – the lion mascot of Texas A&M University at Commerce, formerly East Texas State University.
 Lucy – a live binturong who is a mascot of the University of Cincinnati. Lucy lives at the Cincinnati Zoo and frequently attends university events on a leash.

M
 Mac T. Bulldog and Lulu – Bulldogs, co-mascots of Gardner–Webb University
 Mac the Scot – official mascot of Macalester College
 Mad Jack – name of the mountaineer mascot of Western State Colorado University
 Magnus – the current mascot of Cleveland State University
 Mammoth -official mascot of Amherst College
 Mandrake – short lived secondary mascot of the University of Oregon 
 Marauder – official mascot of Millersville University (a marauder is a land pirate)
Marco – the costumed American bison mascot of the Marshall Thundering Herd
 Mario the Magnificent Dragon – the official mascot of the Drexel University Dragons
 Marty the Saint – the official mascot of Saint Martin's University
 Marvin the Miner – Colorado School of Mines
The Masked Rider – one of the official mascots of the Texas Tech Red Raiders
 Matty the Matador – the mascot of Cal State Northridge
 Max C. Bear – the costumed mascot of SUNY Potsdam
Miami Maniac – the baseball mascot of the University of Miami
Mike the Tiger – live tiger (usually a Bengal tiger, but currently a Bengal-Siberian mix) mascot of the LSU Tigers, as well as the costumed tiger mascot.
 Minerva the Spartan – the official mascot of The University of North Carolina at Greensboro
 Mingus – the costumed jazz cat – official mascot for Berklee College of Music.
 Mingo – the costumed Husky mascot of Houston Baptist University.
 Miss Pawla— a costumed jaguaress of the University of South Alabama. She is the friend of Southpaw (see below).
 Mr. C (full name: Mr. Commodore) – the costumed commodore mascot of Vanderbilt University
 Mr. Wuf and Ms. Wuf – the costumed wolf mascots of the North Carolina State Wolfpack; they were married during halftime of the NC State-Wake Forest game on February 28, 1981 (Wake Forest University's Demon Deacon mascot presiding).
 Mocsie – Snake-like mascot of the Florida Southern College "Moccasins."
 Moe – kangaroo mascot of the VMI Keydets
 MoHarv – the golden eagle mascot of the University of Charleston in Charleston, West Virginia.
 Mo the Mule – the official mascot of University of Central Missouri
 Monado – the Bengal Tiger mascot of Zane State College in Ohio
 Monte – the costumed mustang mascot of Morningside College in Sioux City, Iowa.
Monte – the grizzly bear mascot of the University of Montana
 Monty the Eagle – Niagara University
 Monty the Mountaineer – Schreiner University
Monty Montezuma the Aztec Warrior – San Diego State University
Mortimer the Gopher – Goucher College
Mountaineer – a West Virginia University student who dresses in pioneer costume as the school's mascot
 Mulerider and Molly the Mule – the mascots of Southern Arkansas University
 Musty the Mustang – the mascot of California Polytechnic State University
 MUcaw – the mascot of Mount Union in Alliance, Ohio.

N
 Nathan the Quaker – mascot of the Guilford College Quakers 
 Nitro the Knight – mascot of the Fairleigh Dickinson Knights
The Nittany Lion – mascot of the Penn State Nittany Lions
 Norm the Niner – mascot of the Charlotte 49ers
 Norm the Crimson Hawk – mascot of the IUP Crimson Hawks
 NYIT Bear – mascot of the NYIT Bears
 Nestor – Owl, mascot of the Westfield State University Owls

O
 Oakie – costumed acorn mascot of SUNY-ESF
 Oakley the Barn Owl – the mascot of Texas Woman's University.
 Objee – costumed bear mascot of the United States Coast Guard Academy and until 1984 a live bear kept on campus.
 Ody Owl – the costumed owl mascot of the Mississippi University for Women
 Old Sarge – costumed soldier mascot of Norwich University.
 Ole the Lion – mascot of St. Olaf College.
 Olé Gaucho – mascot of the University of California, Santa Barbara.
 Olé the Viking – mascot of Long Beach City College Vikings, in Long Beach, California.
 Ollie the Owl – mascot of Brandeis University, carrying a gavel (as the nickname is the Judges).
Oski the Bear – costumed mascot of the California Golden Bears
 Otto the Orange – mascot of Syracuse University
Otus the Owl- mascot of Southern Connecticut State University
 Owls – mascot of Temple University and Rice University and Bryn Mawr College and Kenyon College
 Owlsley – costumed burrowing owl mascot of Florida Atlantic University.
 Ozzie – costumed osprey mascot of the University of North Florida.
 Ozzy – costumed mascot of the Ozarks Technical Community College.

P
 The Panther – the athletic mascot of Middlebury College, whose 31 varsity teams are known as the Middlebury Panthers.
 Patrick the Patriot – the costumed mascot of Dallas Baptist University, Patriots.
 Paws – official costumed mascot of the Western Carolina University Catamounts.
 Paws – mascot of Northeastern University Huskies.
 Paydirt Pete – a costumed student who serves as a mascot for the University of Texas at El Paso Miners.
 Pedey – The mascot of the Mesalands Community College Stampede
 PeeDee the Pirate – a costumed student who serves as mascot for East Carolina University
 Pegasus and the UCF Knight – a live white Andalusian stallion that charges on the field at the beginning of games with the Knight as a rider for the University of Central Florida
 Peruna – A Shetland pony who represents the Southern Methodist University Mustangs
 Pete & Penny – two emperor penguins dressed in scarfs and stocking caps for Youngstown State University
 Peter the Anteater – the mascot based on the "ZOT!"-emitting animal from the comic strip B.C., at the University of California Irvine since 1965
 Pete the Panther – a costumed student who serves as a mascot for the Florida Tech Panthers.
 Petey Penmen – the costumed mascot of Southern New Hampshire University.
 Petey the Stormy Petrel – the costumed mascot of Oglethorpe University 
 Philip D. Tiger – The greyish yellow Bengal tiger in a blue and white basketball jersey of St. Philip's College. He is mainly on the walls and in promotional pictures of St. Philip's College. The D. stands for "Da" as in the word "the".
 Phoenix – Florida Polytechnic University, Olin College, the costumed mascot of Elon University (formerly the Fightin'Christians), The University of Chicago (nickname the Maroons), University of Wisconsin–Green Bay and Swarthmore College
 Pioneers – the mascot of Grinnell College, Iowa
 Pioneer Pete – a costumed student who serves as mascot of California State University, East Bay (Hayward, California)
 Pirate – the mascot of the Seton Hall Pirates at Seton Hall & also Hampton University's nickname of their athletic department and mascot.Pistol Pete – a costumed student who serves as mascot of the Oklahoma State as well as the costumed mascots of the University of Wyoming and New Mexico State University.
 Play – one of the two costumed tiger mascots of Texas Southern University.
 Polar Bear – the mascot of Bowdoin College, Ohio Northern University and the University of Alaska Fairbanks (where it is also known as Nanook).
 Pork Chop – the kid-sized junior Razorback mascot of the University of Arkansas
 Porky – The javelina mascot of Texas A&M University–Kingsville, Kingsville
 Pouncer – the costumed tiger mascot of University of Memphis.
 Pounce the Cougar – the cougar mascot of University of Minnesota Morris.
 Pounce the Panther – the mascot of Georgia State University. It is also the official Panther mascot of Purdue University North Central since 2003.
 Pounce Panther – the mascot of the Milwaukee Panthers.
 Predator – owl mascot of Bryn Mawr College, and the symbol of Athena.
 Power Cat – the tiger mascot of the University of the Pacific
 Privateer Pete – the Privateer mascot of the State University of New York Maritime College
 Prospector Pete – the inflated balloon mascot of Long Beach State
 Prowler – the costumed panther mascot of High Point University
 Purple Cow – the gold-spotted mascot of Williams College
 Puddles – The name of the University of Oregon former live duck mascot. Unofficial name of The Duck.
 Purple Knight – The staff carrying Purple Knight is the mascot of Saint Michael's College
 Purple Knight – The Purple Knight is the mascot of University of Bridgeport
 Puckman – the animated hard-hat wearing walking hockey puck mascot of Rensselaer Polytechnic InstitutePurdue Pete – costumed mascot of Purdue University

R
 Racer 1— live horse mascot during football games for Murray State University
 Raider – mascot of Colgate UniversityRaider Red – one of the official mascots of the Texas Tech Red Raiders
 Rally – the mascot of the University of Vermont Catamounts.
 Rally the Red Hawk – the mascot of the Ripon College (Wisconsin) Red Hawks.Ralphie – a live American bison the official mascot of the Colorado Buffaloes
 Ralphie and Roxie – Greyhounds, co-mascots of Eastern New Mexico UniversityRamblin' Wreck – the 1930 Ford Model A Sports Coupe mascot of Georgia TechRameses – a live ram that serves as the mascot for the North Carolina Tar Heels. It is also the name of the costumed mascot.
 Rammy – the mascot for West Chester University of Pennsylvania.
 RAMbo – the mascot for Shepherd University.
 Ranger D. Bear – the mascot for University of Wisconsin–Parkside
 Razor the Shark – Nova Southeastern University
 Rawhide – the mascot for Western New Mexico University
 Red The Cardinal – the mascot of MCPHS University
 Red Dragons – the mascot of The State University of New York College at Oneonta (SUNY Oneonta)
 Reddie Spirit – Henderson State UniversityReggie Redbird – Illinois State UniversityReveille – a live collie that serves as the mascot for the Texas A&M Aggies and is taken care of by the Corps of CadetsReveley (The Griffin) - mascot of the William & Mary Tribe
 Rex the Lion – Queens University of Charlotte
 Rett and Ave – co-mascots of Averett University
Rhett the Boston Terrier – the Boston Terrier representing Boston University
Rhody the Ram – University of Rhode Island
 Ribby – The Razorback mascot for the University of Arkansas baseball team.
 RITchie the Tiger – the mascot for the Rochester Institute of Technology.
 Riptide – the costumed pelican mascot of Tulane University.
 Riverbats aka R.B. – the official mascot of Austin Community College debuted November 2010.
 Roar-ee the Lion – the official mascot of Columbia University. Created in May 1910.
 Roary the Lion – the current official mascot of Missouri Southern State University
 Roary the Panther – the official mascot of the Florida International University Panthers
Roc the Panther – the costumed mascot of the Pittsburgh Panthers (University of Pittsburgh).
 RoCCy – a costumed tiger, the official mascot of Colorado College. Changed from Prowler in 2020.
 Rocky – a costumed yellowjacket, the official mascot of the University of Rochester
 Rocky – a costumed bulldog, one of two official mascots for Western Illinois University.
 Rocky Raider – the mascot for Three Rivers Community College (Poplar Bluff, Missouri).
Rocky the Bull – the mascot of University of South Florida.
 Rocky II the Lion – mascot for the Slippery Rock University of Pennsylvania Pride.
 Rocky the Red Hawk – mascot of Montclair State University.
 Rocky the Rocket and Rocksy the Rockette – anthropomorphized rockets, co-mascots of the University of Toledo.
 Rocky – a costumed mascot of University of North Carolina at Asheville.
 Rocky I – a live Old English Bulldog, live mascot of University of North Carolina at Asheville.
 Rodney the Ram – the mascot of Virginia Commonwealth University.
 Rodney the Raven – the mascot of Anderson University in Indiana.
 Roscoe The Lion – The mascot of The College Of New Jersey in New Jersey.
 Rosie – the costumed elephant mascot of the Rose-Hulman Institute of Technology "Fightin' Engineers."
 Roomie the Lion – mascot of the Southeastern Louisiana University.
 Roongo the Husky – is the mascot for Bloomsburg University of Pennsylvania.
 Rooney – is the official mascot for the Roanoke College Maroons.
Rowdy – an unofficial mascot of Purdue University (for official mascot – see Boilermaker Special)
 Rowdy – a roadrunner that is the costumed mascot of California State University, Bakersfield (CSUB).
 Rowdy – a roadrunner that is the mascot of Metropolitan State University of Denver 
Rowdy – a roadrunner that is the mascot for the University of Texas at San Antonio.
 Rowdy Raider – is the mascot for Wright State University. It used to be a Viking, but was changed to a wolf in 1997.
 Rowdy the Panther – is the mascot for Birmingham–Southern College.
 Rowdy the Riverhawk – is the mascot for the University of Massachusetts Lowell.
 Rowdy the Red Hawk – is the mascot for Southeast Missouri State University
 Rowdy the Cowboy – is the mascot for McNeese State University
 Rowdy the Maverick – is the mascot for Colorado Mesa University
 Rudy Flyer – is the mascot for the University of Dayton
 Rudy the Redhawk – is the mascot for Seattle University
 Ruckus – the red-tailed hawk mascot of the University of Denver Out of use since 2008.
 Rufus – the bobcat mascot for Ohio University.
 Rufus – the red wolf mascot for Indiana University East.

S
 Saluki – live dog mascot of the Southern Illinois Salukis
Sam the Minuteman – mascot of the UMass Minutemen and Minutewomen
Sam the Ram – mascot of the Framingham State Rams
 Sammy D. Eagle – mascot of the Mary Washington Eagles
 Sammy Seahawk – mascot of the Broward College Seahawks
 Sammy Spartan – mascot of the San Jose State Spartans
Sammy the Seagull – mascot of the Salisbury University Seagulls
Sammy the Owl – mascot of the Rice Owls
 Sammy the Slug – mascot of the UC Santa Cruz Banana Slugs
Sammy and Samantha Bearkat – co-mascots of the Sam Houston State Bearkats
 Saints – Saint Bernard dog, mascot of the Emmanuel College (Massachusetts) Saints
 The Scarlet Knight – mascot of the Rutgers Scarlet Knights
 Scarlet Hawk – mascot of the Illinois Institute of Technology Scarlet Hawks
 Scorch – The official mascot of Minnesota State University, Moorhead.
 Scorch – The official mascot of Southeastern University (Florida).
 Scrappy – The owl mascot of Kennesaw State University
 Scrappy – the eagle mascot of the North Texas Mean Green
Scrappy – Mockingbird, mascot of the Chattanooga Mocs
 Scratch – a student in wildcat costume who is one of three official mascots of the University of Kentucky, two of which attend games. Scratch is a more child-friendly version of "The Wildcat", the other mascot that attends games.
 Screech A. Eagle – official mascot of Northwestern College (Minnesota)
 Screech the Owl – mascot of William Woods University
 Scottie – the scottie dog mascot of Agnes Scott College.
 Scotty – the costumed kilt-clad mascot of Alma College.
 Scotty the Scottie Dog – mascot of Carnegie Mellon University.
 Scotty Highlander – A tartan clad highlander bear representing UC Riverside.
 Scrotie – of the Rhode Island School of Design
Sebastian the Ibis – mascot of the Miami Hurricanes. The Florida ibis according to folklore is the last bird to leave the area before a hurricane and the first bird to come back after the storm. "Sebastian" once carried a corn-cob pipe in its beak.
 Seahawks – the Osprey mascot of Salve Regina University
 Seymour D'Campus – costumed mascot of Southern Miss Golden Eagles
 Shadow – costumed mascot of Monmouth University (NJ).
 The Shark – mascot of UNLV. While the school's teams are named the Rebels (Runnin' Rebels for men's basketball only) the mascot is a shark in honor of former men's basketball coach Jerry Tarkanian nicknamed "The Shark".
Shasta and Sasha – the mascot of the University of Houston's Houston Cougars – a male and a female costumed cougar, as well as a live, sponsored cougar enclosure at the Houston Zoo.
 Shooter – The second generation red fox mascot for Marist College.
 Sir Big Spur – a live rooster at the University of South Carolina since 2006
 Sir Lance-a-lute – mascot of Pacific Lutheran University 
 Sir Paladin – the costumed mascot of Furman University
Skitch – Sasquatch (Bigfoot) mascot of Community Colleges of Spokane
 Skully – giant red parrot sidekick of the official "Marauder" mascot of Millersville University
 Skully – Unofficial mascot of the East Carolina Pirates
Smokey – a live bluetick coonhound, the official mascot for the Tennessee Volunteers. The name is also applied to the costumed mascot.
 Sooner – one of the two white ponies of the University of Oklahoma that pulls the Sooner Schooner (the other pony's name is Boomer). There is both a live pony and costumed mascot.
Sooner Schooner – a scale replica of a Conestoga wagon pulled by two ponies and driven by the RUF/NEKS of the University of Oklahoma.
 Southpaw – a costumed jaguar of the University of South Alabama.
Sparky the Sun Devil – the maroon and gold devil mascot of the Arizona State Sun Devils
 Sparky – the eagle mascot of the Liberty University Flames. The name also applies to the dragon mascot of the Illinois-Chicago Flames.
Sparty – the mascot of Michigan State University, a comical (and extremely buff) representation of a Spartan hoplite soldier clad in green with an elongated head.
 Speedy the Geoduck – mascot of Evergreen State College (Washington)
 Spike – the name given to several costume Bulldog mascots including Gonzaga , Samford , The Citadel, and Drake, as well as the inflatable-costumed mascot of the University of Georgia
 Spike and Simone – The two Bulldog mascots of Truman State University.
 Spiro – the Spartan mascot of the University of North Carolina at Greensboro Spartans
 The Stag – the costumed mascot of Fairfield University.
 The Stanford Tree – a dancing conifer of indeterminate species official mascot of Stanford Band unofficial mascot of Stanford University.
 Stanley the Stag – the costumed mascot for the men's teams of the combined athletic program of Harvey Mudd, Scripps, and Claremont McKenna colleges.
 The Statesman – the official mascot of Delta State University.
Stella – live owl mascot of the Temple Owls
 Stertorous "Tor" Thunder – The costumed mascot of Wheaton College (Illinois)
 Stevie Pointer – The mascot of the University of Wisconsin Stevens Point.
 Sting – the costumed mascot of Black Hills State University
 Stomper – the costumed mascot of the Minnesota State University – Mankato Mavericks.
 Storm – tiger mascot for Trine University Thunder, first introduced in 2010.
 Stormy – the cyclonic mascot of Lake Erie College, introduced in 1994.
 Stormy the Shark – the mascot of Simmons University
 Stormin' Normin' – the mascot of the University of New England Nor'easters.
Sturgis – The live owl mascot of Kennesaw State University
 Sunny the Sunbird – mascot of FPU
 Superfrog – the costumed horned frog mascot of TCU
 Swoop – Eagle mascot of the Eastern Washington Eagles and the Emory University Eagles, Hawk mascot of the Utah Utes and the Miami RedHawks
Swoop, Eagle mascot of the Eastern Michigan Eagles
 Sycamore Sam – the happy forest animal costume of no particular species but looks like a blue fox or dog; mascot of the Indiana State Sycamores.

T
Tarzán – live Bulldog of University of Puerto Rico at Mayagüez
 TC and TK — Panthers, co-mascots of the University of Northern Iowa Panthers
Tech – a live Bulldog mascot of Louisiana Tech University
 Terrible Swede – a costumed mascot of Bethany College (Kansas).
Temoc – a costumed comet of the University of Texas at Dallas.
 Texan Rider – a costumed cowboy of the Tarleton State University.
 Testudo – a costumed Diamondback Terrapin of the University of Maryland College Park.
 Teton – a costumed buffalo of Williston State College.
 Thor – the thunderbird mascot of Cloud County Community College.
 Thor – the thunderbird mascot of Mesa Community College.
 Thor – the thunderbird mascot of Southern Utah University.
 Thresher – the threshing stone mascot of Bethel College.
Thundar – the costumed bison mascot of North Dakota State University.
 Thunder – a live American bison the official mascot of West Texas A&M University
 Thunder – costumed bobcat mascot of Georgia College & State University.
 Thunder the Wolf – the official mascot of Northern State University
 Thundercat – the physical embodiment of the Southern Nazarene Crimson Storm.
 The Tiger – the mascot of Princeton University; the first collegiate mascot and subject of the first-organized, recorded cheerleading cheer in 1884. Name reaffirmed as The Tiger in a 2007 referendum with widespread opposition to giving the mascot a name
 The Tiger – the mascot of Clemson University
 The Tiger Cub – the youthful partner of The Tiger at Clemson University
Tim the Beaver – the mascot of the Massachusetts Institute of Technology
Timeout – the costumed Bulldog mascot of Fresno State
 Toby – the costumed bear mascot of Mercer University.
 Toby the Tiger – the costumed mascot of East Texas Baptist University
TOM III – a live Bengal tiger mascot of the University of Memphis
 Tommy Mo – the costumed Saints mascot of Thomas More College.
 Tommy Titan – the mascot of the University of Detroit Mercy.
 Tommy Trojan – thought by many to be the mascot, Tommy Trojan is the shrine of the University of Southern California. Traveler is their mascot.
 Topper the Hilltopper – the mascot of St. Edward's University
Touchdown – also known as the Cornell Big Red Bear, the unofficial mascot of Cornell University was a live bear from 1915 to 1939 when it was replaced with a costume.
 Tough Louie – the lumberjack mascot of Northern Arizona University.
Traveler – a live white horse is the mascot of the University of Southern California who appears during all home football games.
True Grit – the mascot of the University of Maryland, Baltimore County.
Truman the Tiger – the mascot of the University of Missouri, named for former U.S. president Harry S. Truman (the only Missouri native to hold the office).
Tupper the Bulldog – the mascot of Bryant University and named for Earl Tupper, the creator of Tupperware
 Tuffy – the costumed eagle of the Ashland University Eagles.
 Tuffy – the costumed elephant of the Cal State Fullerton Titans.
 Tuffy – the live mascot of the NC State Wolfpack. Tuffy is a dog, either a Tamaskan or a German Shepherd–Husky mix.
 T-Roy – The mascot of the Troy University Trojans.
Tusk – the live Russian boar mascot of the University of Arkansas.
 Tyler the Tiger – the costumed tiger mascot of DePauw University.

U
Uga – live Bulldog, mascot of the Georgia Bulldogs

V
 Val the Valkyrie – mascot of Converse University Valkyries
 Venom – Rattlesnake mascot of the Florida A&M Rattlers and Lady Rattlers
 Vic and Tory – live Greyhounds, community ambassadors of Eastern New Mexico University 
 Vic the Demon – mascot of the Northwestern State Demons and Lady Demons
 Victor E. Bluejay – mascot of the Elmhurst University Bluejays
Victor E. Bull – mascot of the Buffalo Bulls
 Victor E. Huskie – mascot of the Northern Illinois Huskies
 Victor E. Tiger – mascot of the Fort Hays State Tigers
 Victor E. Lion – mascot of the Molloy University Lions
 Victor E. Viking – mascot of the Northern Kentucky Norse, the Portland State Vikings, and the Western Washington Vikings
 Viktor the Viking – mascot of the Grand View Vikings
 Victor E. Hawk – mascot of the Viterbo University V-Hawks
 Victor E. Warrior – mascot of the Wisconsin Lutheran College Warriors
 Vili – unofficial mascot of the University of Hawaiʻi at Mānoa, played by Vili Fehoko 
 Vinny the Dolphin – mascot of the College of Mount Saint Vincent Dolphins
 Vixen – mascot of the Sweet Briar College Vixens

W
 W – mascot of the Wayne State Warriors
 Wakiza (Kiza) – live Husky mascot of the Houston Christian Huskies
 Waldo – Wildcat mascot of the Weber State Wildcats
War Eagle VII – live golden eagle mascot of the Auburn Tigers 
 Wally Pilot – mascot of the Portland Pilots
 Wally Wabash – Human mascot of the Wabash Little Giants
 WebstUR – Spider mascot of the Richmond Spiders
 Wellington – Wildcat mascot of the Central Washington Wildcats
 Wesley the Wildcat – mascot of the Indiana Wesleyan Wildcats
 Whoo RU – Owl mascot of the Rowan University Profs
Wilbur and Wilma T. Wildcat – co-mascots of the Arizona Wildcats
Wild E. Cat – mascot of the New Hampshire Wildcats
 The Wildcat – a costumed student who is one of three official mascots of the University of Kentucky, two of which attend games.
 Wildcat Willy – mascot of the Northern Michigan Wildcats
 Will D. Cat – mascot of the Villanova Wildcats
 Will E. Wildcat - mascot of the Davidson Wildcats
 Willie Warhawk – mascot of the Wisconsin–Whitewater Warhawks
 Willie the Wave – mascot of the Pepperdine Waves
 Willie T. Wildcat – mascot of the Johnson & Wales University Wildcats
 Willie the Wildcat – mascot of the Chico State Wildcats
 Willie the Wildcat - mascot of the Kansas State Wildcats
 Willie the Wildcat - mascot of the Northwestern Wildcats
 Wily the Bobcat – mascot of the Lees-McRae College Bobcats
 Wiley D. Wildcat – mascot of the Wilmington University Wildcats
 Wolfie – mascot of the Stony Brook Seawolves, the Western Oregon Wolves, and the West Georgia Wolves
 Wolfie (Jr.) – secondary mascot of the Nevada Wolf Pack
Woody – Timberwolf, mascot of the Northwood Timberwolves
Woody Wood Duck – mascot of the Century College Wood Ducks
WuShock – Anthropomorphic wheat, mascot of the Wichita State Shockers

Y
 Yank – Tiger, mascot of the Hampden–Sydney Tigers
YoUDee – Blue hen, mascot of the Delaware Fightin' Blue Hens
Yosef – Human mascot of the Appalachian State Mountaineers

Z
Zippy the Kangaroo – Kangaroo, mascot of the Akron Zips

See also
 Mascot#Sports mascots
 List of college sports team nicknames in North America
 Religious symbolism in U.S. sports team names and mascots
 College athletics

References

External links
 Complete List of American Colleges and Universities; showing mascot, conference, affiliation, location, and year established.
 Mascot.net College mascot resource
 USAToday lists various mascot facts
 College football's 12 coolest mascots – 1. Ralphie the Buffalo (Colorado), 2. Uga (Georgia), 3. Chief Osceola (Florida State), 4. Mike the Tiger (LSU), 5. War Eagle (Auburn), 6. Stanford Tree, 7. Bevo (Texas), 8. The Mountaineer (West Virginia), 9. The Masked Rider (Texas Tech), 10. Sparty (Michigan State), 11. The Leprechaun (Notre Dame), 12. The Fighting Duck (Oregon). FoxSports.com. Retrieved 2010-09-01.

American mascots
 
College mascots in the United States